The Morton Arboretum, in Lisle, Illinois, United States, is a public garden, and outdoor museum with a library, herbarium, and program in tree research including the Center for Tree Science. Its grounds, covering 1,700 acres (6.9 square kilometres), include cataloged collections of trees and other living plants, gardens, and restored areas, among which is a restored tallgrass prairie. The living collections include more than 4,100 different plant species. There are more than 200,000 cataloged plants.

As a place of recreation, the Arboretum has hiking trails, roadways for driving and bicycling, a  interactive children's garden and a  maze.

The Schulenberg Prairie at the Arboretum was one of the earliest prairie restoration projects in the Midwest, begun in 1962. It is one of the largest restored prairies in the Chicago suburban area.

The Arboretum offers an extensive nature-centered education program for children, families, school groups, scouts, and adults, including tree and restoration professionals. The Woodland Stewardship Program offers classroom and online courses in ecological restoration techniques. The Arboretum also offers credit courses through the Associated Colleges of the Chicago Area, a regional consortium.

Mission 
The stated mission of The Morton Arboretum is to collect and study trees, shrubs, and other plants from around the world, to display them across naturally beautiful landscapes for people to study and enjoy, and to learn how to grow them in ways that enhance the environment. 
Its stated goal is to encourage the planting and conservation of trees and other plants for a greener, healthier, and more beautiful world. 

The International Union for Conservation of Nature (IUCN) designated the Morton Arboretum as its Center for Species Survival:Trees, to study and promote the conservation and restoration of global tree ecosystems and strategies for species survival.

History 

The arboretum was established on December 14, 1922, by Joy Morton, founder of the Morton Salt Company. Morton's father, Julius Sterling Morton, had founded Arbor Day. Morton's daughter, Jean Cudahy (Morton) took her father's seat on the board of trustees after he died in 1934. The arboretum's first superintendent was Clarence E. Godshalk, who had received a master's degree in landscape design from the University of Michigan in 1921. Joy Morton's Thornhill Estate, established in 1910, formed the core of the Arboretum's original area. In 1940, Mrs. Cudahy hired May Theilgaard Watts as a teacher in the new educational program. The Morton family requested an educational center be constructed on the site of their home. The estate was razed in the early 1940s following the death of Joy's wife Margaret. 1962 marked the beginning of the Schulenberg Prairie Restoration Project. Clarence Godshalk developed plans to create a buffer on the western border of the Arboretum. He called it "a native planting" and planned for it to be on farmland acquired by the Arboretum in the late 1950s. He wanted to turn old farmland back into a prairie with seeds collected from prairies nearby. He asked Ray Schulenberg to take this on. Schulenberg developed restoration goals and began replicating composition, structure, and local gene pools of plants in local prairies. He studied all of this with Floyd Swink, the Arboretum's taxonomist at the time, Robert Betz, a biologist, and David Kropp, a landscape architect.

Board of Trustees 
The first chairman of the board of trustees for the Morton Arboretum was Joy Morton himself. Following his death in 1934, his daughter, Jean M. Cudahy (Morton), became chairman of the board. Jean died in 1953 and her brother, Sterling, became chairman of the board. When Sterling died in 1961, his daughter Suzette Morton Davidson took over his place as chairman of the board. in 1977, Suzette Morton retired and was replaced by the first person outside of the Morton family to be chairman of the board, Charles C. Hafner III. In 2000, W. Robert Reum took over as chairman of the board. As of 2014, Darrell B. Jackson has been chairman of the board of trustees.

Directors 
In 1938, Clarence Godshalk was named director of the Morton Arboretum. He served for 28 years, before he retired in 1966. He was replaced by Dr. Marion Trufant Hall, who served as director until 1990, when Gerard T. Donnelly was named executive director and CEO.

Sterling Morton Library 
Designed by noted Chicago architect Harry Weese, the Sterling Morton Library was constructed in 1963 and named after Sterling Morton, son of founder Joy Morton. It currently holds more than 30,000 books and magazines, as well as tens of thousands of non-book items including prints, original art, letters, photographs, landscape plans and drawings. The collections focus on plant sciences, especially on trees and shrubs; gardening and landscape design; ecology, with a special interest in Midwestern prairie, savanna, woodland, and wetland ecosystems; natural history; and botanical art. Its catalog is online.

The Library's Suzette Morton Davidson Special Collections includes books, artwork, historic nursery catalogs, landscape drawings, photographs, letters, maps and institutional documents. It also includes documents of May Theilgaard Watts, Jens Jensen, Marshall Johnson, O.C. Simonds and Donald Culross Peattie.

The Sterling Morton Library is a member of the Council on Botanical and Horticultural Libraries.

Visitor Center

The  Visitor Center was built in 2004 and designed by David Woodhouse Architects. The building includes wood representing the Arboretum's collections and incorporates sustainable features such as permeable pavers in the parking lots and local fieldstone salvaged from a predecessor building.

Illumination 
An annual Illumination of tree lights is conducted at the Arboretum from the end of November until early January. Visitors are able to enjoy the light show, music, and beverages. The illumination section is along a mile-stretch of curved, paved pathway. The creation of the illumination occurred in 2013. The creator is a lighting designer from the United Kingdom named John Featherstone. He started his career lighting many concerts and plays. Later he opened a museum, and then began his work at the Morton Arboretum.

See also 
 Chicago Botanic Garden
 List of botanical gardens in the United States
 List of Museums and Cultural Institutions in Chicago
 North American Plant Collections Consortium

References

External links

Morton Arboretum website
 The Morton Arboretum at Google Cultural Institute
David Woodhouse Architects Images of Visitor Center
Illinois Great Places

Arboreta in Illinois
Botanical gardens in Illinois
Lisle, Illinois
Protected areas of DuPage County, Illinois
1922 establishments in Illinois
Nature centers in Illinois